Freedom of speech and freedom of the press in Denmark are ensured by § 77 of the constitution:
Anyone is entitled to in print, writing and speech to publish his or hers thoughts, yet under responsibility to the courts. Censorship and other preventive measures can never again be introduced.

There's widespread agreement in Danish legal theory that § 77 protects what is called "formal freedom of speech" (formel ytringsfrihed), meaning that one cannot be required to submit one's speech for review by authorities before publishing or otherwise disseminating it. However, there is disagreement about whether or not § 77 covers "material freedom of speech" (materiel ytringsfrihed), the right to not be punished for ones speech. There is agreement that the phrasing "under responsibility to the courts" gives legislators some right to restrict speech, but conversely there have been several court decisions implying that some material freedom of speech does exist. The discussion is about whether the material speech has limits or not, and if so, what those limits are.

The major punishable acts are child pornography, libel, and hate speech/racism, which are restricted by the Danish penal code. Like most other countries, Denmark also forbids publishing classified material harmful to state security, copyright-protected material without permission and revealing trade secrets in the civil law.

In 2004, 2005, and 2009 Denmark received a joint first place in the Worldwide Press Freedom Index from Reporters Without Borders. Since 2011, Denmark has consistently been in the top-10 out of 179 countries in the index and it was fourth in 2016.

Child pornography
The provision against child pornography are set down in §§ 235 and 230 of the penal code:

§ 235. Dissemination of obscene photographs or films, other obscene visual reproductions, or similar depictions of persons under 18.
§ 230. Taking indecent photographs, films, etc. of a person under 18 with intent to sell or otherwise disseminate.

Libel
The provision against libel is set down in § 267 of the penal code:

Blasphemy
For 151 years, up until the middle of 2017, blasphemy was forbidden by § 140 of the penal code:

The law was rarely used by prosecutors, however. In 1997 a Danish artist burned a copy of the Bible on a TV news show broadcast by the publicly funded Danish Broadcasting Corporation. The artist was never charged for blasphemy. Only two people were ever convicted under the law during its lifetime and from 2007 to 2017, only 4 complaints of violating the law were reported to law enforcement. Bills repealing the law had been proposed multiple times, but none were successful until 2017 when the first prosecution since 1971 was filed against a man for posting a video of him burning the Quran on Facebook, reigniting the debate over the law. Parliament voted to repeal the law, with 8 of the 9 parties in the Folketing supporting the repeal.

Hate speech and racism

The rules against hate speech and racism are set down in § 266b of the Danish penal code:

Free speech advocate Lars Hedegaard was prosecuted under this statute for remarks made to a blogger in December 2009 criticizing Islam. He was first acquitted in the District Court in January 2011, then convicted upon appeal to High Court in May 2011, and finally acquitted by the Danish Supreme Court in April 2012 which ruled that it could not be proved that he intended for the statements to be published. Danish politician Jesper Langballe pleaded guilty and was convicted of hate speech for comments he made about rape and honour killings in Muslim families in a newspaper article in connection with Hedegaard's case.

State security

In February and March 2004 three Berlingske Tidende journalists, Michael Bjerre, Jesper Larsen, and Niels Lunde, were prosecuted for "harming state security" after publishing the details of classified intelligence reports about the lack of weapons of mass destruction in Iraq. In December 2006 the three were acquitted by a Copenhagen court.

See also

 Freedom of speech by country
 Censorship in Denmark

References

External links
Danish Penal Code (in Danish). (English translation)
Freedom of expression in Denmark - International Freedom of Expression Exchange (IFEX)

Human rights in Denmark
Denmark
Denmark